Qavamabad (also Romanized as Qavāmābād; also known as Ghawam Abad Korbal, Qavāmābād-e Korbāl, and Qavāmābād-e Pā’īn) is a village in Sofla Rural District, in the Central District of Kharameh County, Fars Province, Iran. At the 2006 census, its population was 878, in 217 families.

References 

Populated places in Kharameh County